The AllStarInc Panthers were a professional indoor football team based in Reading, Pennsylvania. They were members of American Indoor Football (AIF) for the 2015 season. The Panthers played their home games at Santander Arena in Reading.

History

The ASI Panthers had previously existed as a semi-independent indoor team; the Panthers were one of the teams in AllStarInc's "ASI Developmental Football League." The team's 2014 schedule included games against the Erie Explosion and Baltimore Mariners.

On October 10, 2014, American Indoor Football (AIF) announced that the ASI Panthers would be joining the league as part 2015 expansion. The Panthers were officially announced as a 2015 expansion team of the AIF in November 2014. The Panthers left AIF after the 2015 season and announced they would play an independent schedule. In January 2016, the Indoor Football Alliance (IFA) included the Panthers in their 2016 draft and listed them as a member. The IFA failed to launch that season and the Panthers played in the semi-pro, outdoor Minor League Football (MLF). The semi-pro team has since changed its name to the Penn Panthers.

Notable players

Roster

Awards and honors
The following is a list of all ASI Panthers players who have won league Awards

All-League players
The following Panthers players have been named to All-League Teams:
 WR Daryl Shine (1)
 OL Mohamed Kourouma (1), Oscar Gonzalez (1), Zion Pyatt (1)
 DL Jonas Celian (1), Abe Koroma (1), Tim Hume (1)
 LB Herschel Thornton (1)
 DB John Williams (1)

Coaches of note

Head coaches
Note: Statistics are correct through the end of the 2015 American Indoor Football season.

Coaching staff

Season-by-season results

References

External links
 Official website
 Penn Panthers website

Former American Indoor Football teams
American football teams established in 2014
American football teams in Pennsylvania
2014 establishments in Pennsylvania